Jeromy Neal Burnitz (born April 15, 1969) is an American former professional baseball player. Burnitz was a right fielder in Major League Baseball who played with the New York Mets (1993–94, 2002–03), Cleveland Indians (1995–96), Milwaukee Brewers (1996–2001), Los Angeles Dodgers (2003), Colorado Rockies (2004), Chicago Cubs (2005), and Pittsburgh Pirates (2006).

Early days
Burnitz played his collegiate ball at Oklahoma State University, and in 1988, played collegiate summer baseball in the Cape Cod Baseball League for the Hyannis Mets. He played minor league ball with the Welsh Waves, the Pittsfield Mets and the Buffalo Bisons.

Career

Burnitz was drafted in the first round of the 1990 draft by the New York Mets with the 17th overall selection. He made his major league debut in 1993. He exhibited both power and speed, but was traded by them to the Cleveland Indians. Burnitz never cracked the Cleveland lineup and it was only after his trade to Milwaukee in 1996 that he emerged as an everyday player.

Burnitz was a constant crowd favorite in Milwaukee, providing many of the only thrills during an otherwise low point in Brewers' history in their first years in the National League. In 1999 he started the game, replacing the injured Tony Gwynn and became the first Brewer since Paul Molitor to start in the All-Star Game. After signing a contract extension with the Brewers in 2000, he was briefly the franchise's highest paid player of all time. On September 25, 2001, Burnitz and teammate Richie Sexson each hit three home runs in a 9–4 win against the Arizona Diamondbacks. It was the first and, as of the 2021 season, only time that two players hit three home runs in the same game, let alone two teammates. In 2002, he returned to the Mets, but did not perform as well with his original team as both he and Mets fans hoped: his .215 batting average was the lowest among qualified batters. He was traded to Los Angeles in the Mets' 2003 purge of high-salaried players, and signed the following year with the Colorado Rockies.

In 2004, Burnitz signed with the Colorado Rockies, and became part of some rare home run displays.  On April 27, he, rookie Matt Holliday, and Charles Johnson combined to slug back-to-back-to-back home runs against the Florida Marlins, the sixth such occasion in franchise history.  In a May 18 game against the Cincinnati in which he hit two home runs, both were part of back-to-back home run sets with Holliday, making them the first teammates in franchise history to hit back-to-back home runs twice in the same game, and the first teammate duo to do so since Mike Cameron and Bret Boone of Seattle Mariners in 2002.  In 150 games, he led the Rockies with 37 home runs, hit a career high .283, and was second on the team with 110 RBI. On February 2, 2005, the Cubs signed Burnitz to a one-year contract, the same day Sammy Sosa's trade to the Baltimore Orioles was finalized. He continued to hit well at Wrigley Field with a .258 average, 24 homers and 87 RBI in 160 games with the Cubs.

Burnitz was known as a good clubhouse man and a friendly, laid-back guy. During a slump in May 2006, he held an interview in order to apologize for failing to run out a grounder, then joked about the challenges that his team would face during the rest of the season, saying, "I'm your Highest-Paid Free Agent. That, in and of itself, should tell you the big picture that the team's in."

Personal life
Burnitz is married to Krissy Burnitz. They have three children together.

See also
 List of Major League Baseball career home run leaders

References

Sources
The ESPN Baseball Encyclopedia – Gary Gillette, Peter Gammons, Pete Palmer. Publisher: Sterling Publishing, 2005. Format: Paperback, 1824pp. Language: English.

External links

1969 births
Living people
Baseball players from California
Major League Baseball right fielders
New York Mets players
Cleveland Indians players
Milwaukee Brewers players
Los Angeles Dodgers players
Colorado Rockies players
Chicago Cubs players
Pittsburgh Pirates players
National League All-Stars
Oklahoma State Cowboys baseball players
Hyannis Harbor Hawks players
St. Lucie Mets players
Pittsfield Mets players
Williamsport Bills players
Tidewater Tides players
Norfolk Tides players
Buffalo Bisons (minor league) players
Binghamton Mets players
People from Westminster, California
Conroe High School alumni